Rhys Stanley (born 1 December 1990) is an Australian rules footballer playing for the Geelong Football Club in the Australian Football League (AFL). He previously played for the St Kilda Football Club from 2010 to 2014.

Stanley was recruited from West Adelaide with pick 47 in the 2008 AFL Draft. He played little football growing up but impressed with South Australia in the AFL Under 18 championships and in two senior games for West Adelaide.

Career with St Kilda (2010–2014)
Stanley spent his first AFL season developing with St Kilda's VFL affiliate team Sandringham. He won the 2009 AFL Grand Final Sprint.

In 2010, Stanley played in St Kilda's opening 2010 NAB Cup match against Collingwood, kicking one goal. On 23 May 2010, he made his official debut in Round 9 of the home and away season in which St Kilda defeated the West Coast Eagles at Subiaco. He had nine disposals, three marks, four kicks and five handballs. Stanley played seven games for St Kilda in 2010, with a total of 53 disposals and four goals. From rounds 9 to 14, he played in a tall forward role, helping St Kilda to win all six of these games while the captain, Nick Riewoldt, recovered from a hamstring tear.

Stanley played two games for St Kilda in 2011.

Career with Geelong (2015–present)
Stanley was traded to Geelong, along with pick 60 for pick 21 in the 2014 AFL national draft.

On 12 April 2015, Stanley made his Geelong Cats debut in the second round of the season against the Fremantle Dockers where they were defeated by 44 points but won his first game as a Geelong player in the following round against the Gold Coast Suns. He played six more games in the 2015 season before cementing his spot as the club's first choice ruck for the 2016 season.   

Since joining Geelong in 2015, Stanley has been selected to play in two AFL grand finals, a loss in 2020 against the Richmond Tigers and a premiership victory in 2022 against the Sydney Swans in which he had 16 disposals and 27 hit outs.

In late 2021, Stanley signed a two-year extension to remain at the Geelong Football Club until the end of 2023, taking him to his eighth season at the club and thirteenth as an AFL player.

Statistics
Updated to the end of the 2022 season.

|-
| 2010 ||  || 28
| 7 || 4 || 1 || 24 || 29 || 53 || 23 || 13 || 5 || 0.6 || 0.1 || 3.4 || 4.1 || 7.6 || 3.3 || 1.9 || 0.7 || 0
|- 
| 2011 ||  || 28
| 2 || 1 || 1 || 8 || 6 || 14 || 9 || 2 || 5 || 0.5 || 0.5 || 4.0 || 3.0 || 7.0 || 4.5 || 1.0 || 2.5 || 0
|-
| 2012 ||  || 28
| 12 || 11 || 14 || 82 || 39 || 121 || 56 || 23 || 74 || 0.9 || 1.2 || 6.8 || 3.3 || 10.1 || 4.7 || 1.9 || 6.2 || 0
|- 
| 2013 ||  || 28
| 18 || 6 || 5 || 123 || 65 || 188 || 67 || 26 || 55 || 0.3 || 0.3 || 6.8 || 3.6 || 10.4 || 3.7 || 1.4 || 3.1 || 0
|-
| 2014 ||  || 28
| 19 || 18 || 10 || 129 || 84 || 213 || 121 || 38 || 148 || 0.9 || 0.5 || 6.8 || 4.4 || 11.2 || 6.4 || 2.0 || 7.8 || 2
|- 
| 2015 ||  || 1
| 8 || 6 || 2 || 53 || 46 || 99 || 26 || 22 || 124 || 0.8 || 0.3 || 6.6 || 5.8 || 12.4 || 3.3 || 2.8 || 15.5 || 0
|-
| 2016 ||  || 1
| 21 || 17 || 13 || 137 || 111 || 248 || 77 || 41 || 284 || 0.8 || 0.6 || 6.5 || 5.3 || 11.8 || 3.7 || 2.0 || 13.5 || 2
|- 
| 2017 ||  || 1
| 13 || 8 || 9 || 78 || 78 || 156 || 54 || 32 || 209 || 0.6 || 0.7 || 6.0 || 6.0 || 12.0 || 4.2 || 2.5 || 16.1 || 0
|-
| 2018 ||  || 1
| 15 || 6 || 3 || 99 || 103 || 202 || 44 || 42 || 422 || 0.4 || 0.2 || 6.6 || 6.9 || 13.5 || 2.9 || 2.8 || 28.1 || 0
|- 
| 2019 ||  || 1
| 18 || 7 || 7 || 138 || 111 || 249 || 53 || 46 || 501 || 0.4 || 0.4 || 7.7 || 6.2 || 13.8 || 2.9 || 2.6 || 27.8 || 0
|-
| 2020 ||  || 1
| 11 || 10 || 5 || 72 || 68 || 140 || 32 || 14 || 212 || 0.9 || 0.5 || 6.5 || 6.2 || 12.7 || 2.9 || 1.3 || 19.3 || 0
|- 
| 2021 ||  || 1
| 19 || 8 || 5 || 152 || 129 || 281 || 74 || 33 || 391 || 0.4 || 0.3 || 8.0 || 6.8 || 14.8 || 3.9 || 1.7 || 20.6 || 0
|- 
| scope=row bgcolor=F0E68C | 2022# ||  || 1
| 20 || 3 || 2 || 146 || 111 || 257 || 64 || 36 || 418 || 0.2 || 0.1 || 7.3 || 5.6 || 12.9 || 3.2 || 1.8 || 20.9 || 0
|- class=sortbottom
! colspan=3 | Career
! 183 !! 105 !! 77 !! 1241 !! 980 !! 2221 !! 700 !! 368 !! 2848 !! 0.6 !! 0.4 !! 6.8 !! 5.4 !! 12.1 !! 3.8 !! 2.0 !! 15.6 !! 4
|}

Notes

Honours and achievements
Team
 AFL premiership player: 2022
 2× McClelland Trophy: 2019, 2022

References

External links

Living people
1990 births
Geelong Football Club players
Geelong Football Club Premiership players
Sandringham Football Club players
Australian rules footballers from South Australia
West Adelaide Football Club players
St Kilda Football Club players
One-time VFL/AFL Premiership players